Public Communications Inc. (PCI) is a Chicago, Illinois-based communications agency specializing in crisis and issues management counsel, digital and social marketing services, and integrated communications for healthcare, conservation/environment, education, culture and destination marketing, civic and park district, and nonprofit organizations. Other services include senior counsel for brand and reputation management, executive/board strategic planning, media and presentation coaching; fundraising campaign communications; product launch and lifecycle promotions; awareness campaigns and events; websites, online platforms and collateral. PCI is a founding partner of Worldcom PR Group.

History
Founded in 1962, PCI is consistently ranked by fee income among the largest independent (non-advertising agency owned) firms in the United States and Chicago. The agency is also among the largest certified Women’s Business Enterprise (WBE) public relations agencies in the United States.

References

External links
 Public Communications Inc. – www.pcipr.com
 PCI’s profile on the O’Dwyer PR Website
 O’Dwyers Ranking of Independent PR Firms

Public relations companies of the United States
Companies based in Chicago